Steininger is a surname. Notable people with the surname include:

Jeffree Star (born as Jeffrey Steininger 1985), American business mogul of German heritage
Daniel Steininger (born 1995), German footballer
Ferdinand Steininger (1882–1959), German artist
Franz-Josef Steininger (born 1960), German footballer
Michel Steininger (born 1935), Swiss fencer
Rolf Steininger (born 1942), German historian